Ilkley railway station is a railway station in Ilkley, in the City of Bradford, West Yorkshire, England.  On the Wharfedale Line, it is served by Class 333 electric trains run by Northern Trains, which also manages the station.

Services
During Monday to Saturday, daytime services run to/from Leeds and Bradford twice per hour. In the evenings and all day on Sundays, services are hourly to/from both Leeds and Bradford Forster Square.  Sunday services to Bradford were increased to hourly in December 2017 after new Northern Rail franchise operator Arriva Rail North took over in April 2016; there will also be improvements to weekday evening services and longer trains introduced to help combat overcrowding on the route in the future as part of the new franchise specification.

History
Ilkley station was opened in August 1865 as the western terminus of the Otley and Ilkley Joint Railway (Midland and North Eastern railways). The station buildings were designed by the Chief Architect to the Midland Railway John Holloway Sanders. This railway offered two alternative routes to  - either via  and the Leeds Northern/NER line through  or via  and the former Leeds and Bradford Railway along the Aire Valley. A milepost on the former Platform 4 indicated that the station was 211.25 miles from London St. Pancras.

A further extension of the line opened in 1888 to Skipton via Addingham, Bolton Abbey and Embsay saw the station assume the status of a junction.  Terminating trains only used the bay Platform 1, as the lack of a facing crossover on the approach lines meant that Platform 2 was not available as a terminating road.  Platform 2 was only available as a departure road for trains that were first drawn back towards Ben Rhydding, and then shunted back into the bay.  A carriage storage siding was originally provided between Platforms 1 and 2, explaining the wide gap between the current lines in this location.  The facing crossover was finally installed during the remodelling of the station approaches in 1983, thus allowing terminating trains to directly access Platform 2.

The through lines were served by Platforms 3 (in the down direction) and 4 (up).  The lines continued through the back wall of the station and immediately crossed over Brook Street by way of a bowstring girder bridge with an  span.  This extension eventually fell victim to Dr Beeching's Reshaping of Britain's Railways report.  It was closed to passengers in March 1965 (at the same time as the route via Otley to Leeds) and to all traffic at the beginning of 1966, reducing Ilkley to a terminus once more.  The track alongside both Platforms 3 and 4 remained in place for a time following closure as a through route, with Platform 3 seeing occasional peak-time passenger use, and Platform 4 very occasional engineering use as a stabling siding.  The pedestrian subway leading from the main station concourse to Platform 4 and the back entrance of the station on Railway Road was closed in 1983 owing to the deterioration of the glass roof above it.  Much of the glass in the main roof at this side of the station was removed at this stage, and Platforms 3 and 4 were permanently closed and the track lifted.

Goods traffic was catered for by a yard comprising nine sidings and three through roads situated on the south eastern side of the station, in the area now occupied by Tesco's supermarket and car park.  A large stone built shed and attached offices was situated on one of the through lines.  A five-ton hand-cranked crane stood to the east of the shed.  The yard closed for all freight except coal on 1 February 1965, and to all traffic on 7 August 1967.  The last two wagons were removed on 9 August 1967 after which the yard sidings stood derelict until removed in the mid 1970s.

The original engine shed, dating from the opening of the line was on the site now occupied by the station car park.  In a subsequent development, a two road engine shed and two coaling sidings, together with a 50-foot (15.24 m) turntable were provided on the northern side of the approach lines, and the original facility demolished.  The new shed was some distance below the main running lines and two reversals were required to access it.  The Ilkley brewery building was also provided with a single  siding that also served as the headshunt for access to the engine shed area.  The shed itself closed in January 1959 with the introduction of DMU passenger services.

In the late 1980s, the roofed area covering the western end of the station platforms was closed in and converted into a small supermarket, the lines being shortened by around 40 metres to make room for this alteration.  The main station building was taken out of railway use and turned over to retail in May 1988.  The area between former Platforms 3 and 4 (the Skipton through lines) was infilled during electrification work and is now a carpark.  The vehicle ramp leading up from Station Road passes through the area once occupied by the coal drops at the eastern end of Platform 4.

The line was electrified at 25 kV AC in 1995, and was initially worked by three car Class 308 EMUs.  The previous latticework footbridge - constructed by Andrew Handyside and Co. in 1909 - was demolished during electrification works and replaced with the present structure which has solid sides to protect pedestrians from the overhead wires.

Ilkley is notable in that it was the last British Rail station to be lit by gas.  The gas lights were extinguished for the last time on 8 May 1988.

In November 2011, a major refurbishment of the station, which cost £625,000, was completed.  This new upgrade included the construction of a brand new station building with a ticket office, a heated waiting room and new shelters, also providing space for passengers to await trains.  Also added were new customer information screens, a comprehensive CCTV system and improved PA system, and new gates at the entrance of the station.

Station masters

James Nicholson 1865 - 1906
Thomas Wakefield 1906 - 1924
W.J. Wearn 1924 - 1930 (formerly station master at Oakham, afterwards station master at Wellingborough)
James Garner 1930 - ???? (formerly station master at Shirebrook)

Gallery

See also
Listed buildings in Ilkley

References

Railways Through Airedale & Wharfedale Martin Bairstow (2004) 
The Otley & Ilkley Joint Railway FW Smith and Martin Bairstow (1992) 
Railways in the Northern Dales - 1: The Skipton & Ilkley Line  FW Smith and Donald Binns (1986)

External links

Ilkley Junction signal box

Railway stations in Bradford
DfT Category D stations
Former Otley and Ilkley Joint Railway stations
Railway stations in Great Britain opened in 1865
Northern franchise railway stations
Ilkley
John Holloway Sanders railway stations